The United States deputy attorney general is the second-highest-ranking official in the United States Department of Justice and oversees the day-to-day operation of the Department. The deputy attorney general acts as attorney general during the absence of the attorney general. Lisa Monaco has served in this role since April 21, 2021.

The deputy attorney general is a political appointee of the President of the United States and takes office after confirmation by the United States Senate. The position was created in 1950.

List of United States deputy attorneys general

References

External links
 

Deputy Attorney General
 
Justice